Triathlon has been an event at the Asian Games since 2006 in Doha, Qatar.

Editions

Events

Medal table

Participating nations

List of medalists

External links
 ITU homepage

 
Sports at the Asian Games
Asian Games
Asian Games